Aaron Henry (born November 28, 1988) is an American football coach and former safety who is currently the defensive coordinator at the University of Illinois. He began his professional career with the Oakland Raiders of the National Football League (NFL), and played his college football for the Wisconsin Badgers.

Playing career

High School
Henry was a multi sport athlete at Immokalee High School in Immokallee, Florida. As a wide receiver and defensive back, he helped Immokalee to the 2004 Florida state title and go undefeated in the 2006 regular season. He was an all-state football player, all-county basketball player, and state qualifier in track.

College
He committed to play safety at Wisconsin under head coach Bret Bielema.  There he was a three time Academic All-Big Ten recipient along with being awarded first and second team All-Big Ten.

NFL
In 2012 he was signed as an undrafted free agent by the Oakland Raiders, however he was cut before the regular season.

Coaching career

Arkansas
In 2014 Henry began his career in coaching as a defensive graduate assistant at Arkansas under his former coach at Wisconsin Bret Bielema. He stayed there until the end of the 2015 season.

Rutgers
Henry spent the 2016 season as the defensive back's coach for Rutgers under Chris Ash.

NC State
In 2017 he went to NC State as the team's safeties coach. In 2018 and 2019 he coached the team's cornerbacks.

Vanderbilt
In 2020 he was the cornerback's coach for Vanderbilt.

Illinois
In 2021 he was reunited with Bielema serving as Illinois defensive backs coach. In 2023 he was promoted to the role of defensive coordinator.

References

External links
 Illinois profile

1988 births
Living people
American football defensive backs
Arkansas Razorbacks football coaches
Illinois Fighting Illini football coaches
NC State Wolfpack football coaches
Vanderbilt Commodores football coaches
Wisconsin Badgers football players
People from Immokalee, Florida
Coaches of American football from Florida
Players of American football from Florida